Bernardo Alfonsel Lopez (born 24 February 1954) is a Spanish former racing cyclist. He rode in seven editions of the Tour de France and seven editions of the Vuelta a España between 1977 and 1986. He also rode in the road race event at the 1976 Summer Olympics.

References

External links

1954 births
Living people
Spanish male cyclists
Cyclists from Madrid
Cyclists at the 1976 Summer Olympics
Olympic cyclists of Spain